The 2017 Abierto Mexicano Telcel was a professional tennis tournament played on outdoor hard courts. It was the 24th edition of the men's tournament (17th for the women), and part of the 2017 ATP World Tour and the 2017 WTA Tour. It took place in Acapulco, Mexico between 27 February and 4 March 2017, at the Princess Mundo Imperial.

Points and prize money

Point distribution

Prize money 

1 Qualifiers prize money is also the Round of 32 prize money
* per team

ATP singles main-draw entrants

Seeds

1 Rankings as of February 20, 2017.

Other entrants
The following players received wildcards into the main draw:
  Novak Djokovic
  Alexandr Dolgopolov
  Ernesto Escobedo
  Lucas Gómez

The following player received entry as a special exempt:
  Donald Young

The following players received entry from the qualifying draw:
  Taylor Fritz
  Stefan Kozlov
  Yoshihito Nishioka
  Frances Tiafoe

The following player received entry as a lucky loser:
  Jordan Thompson

Withdrawals
Before the tournament
  Ivo Karlović → replaced by  Dudi Sela
  Alexander Zverev → replaced by  Adrian Mannarino
  Milos Raonic → replaced by  Jordan Thompson

During the tournament
  Steve Johnson

Retirements
  Bernard Tomic (illness)

ATP doubles main-draw entrants

Seeds

1 Rankings as of February 20, 2017.

Other entrants
The following pairs received wildcards into the main draw:
  Santiago González /  David Marrero
  Hans Hach Verdugo /  César Ramírez

The following pair received entry from the qualifying draw:
  Radu Albot /  Mischa Zverev

The following pair received entry as lucky losers:
  Marcelo Arévalo /  Luis Patiño

Withdrawals
Before the tournament
  Jack Sock (right shoulder injury)
  Jordan Thompson (right hand injury)

WTA singles main-draw entrants

Seeds

1 Rankings as of February 20, 2017.

Other entrants
The following players received wildcards into the main draw:
  Daniela Hantuchová
  Renata Zarazúa

The following player received entry using a protected ranking:
  Ajla Tomljanović

The following players received entry from the qualifying draw:
  Jennifer Brady
  Fiona Ferro
  Jamie Loeb
  Bethanie Mattek-Sands
  Chloé Paquet
  Taylor Townsend

Withdrawals 
Before the tournament
  Sara Errani → replaced by  Mirjana Lučić-Baroni
  Viktorija Golubic → replaced by  Heather Watson
  Monica Niculescu → replaced by  Ajla Tomljanović
  Anastasia Pavlyuchenkova → replaced by  Kirsten Flipkens

Retirements 
  Julia Görges (heat illness)
  Mirjana Lučić-Baroni
  Ajla Tomljanović (right shoulder injury)

WTA doubles main-draw entrants

Seeds

1 Rankings as of February 20, 2017.

Other entrants
The following pair received a wildcard into the main draw:
  Giuliana Olmos /  Renata Zarazúa

Withdrawals
During the tournament
  Eugenie Bouchard (abdominal strain)
  Julia Görges (heat illness)

Champions

Men's singles

  Sam Querrey def.  Rafael Nadal, 6–3, 7–6(7–3)

Women's singles

  Lesia Tsurenko def.  Kristina Mladenovic, 6–1, 7–5

Men's doubles

  Jamie Murray /  Bruno Soares def.  John Isner /  Feliciano López, 6–3, 6–3

Women's doubles

  Darija Jurak /  Anastasia Rodionova def.  Verónica Cepede Royg /  Mariana Duque Mariño, 6–3, 6–2

References

External links